Ravid Gazal (born June 9, 1982) is a retired Israeli footballer who now works as the assistant manager of Hapoel Kfar Saba.

Early life
The son of Albert Gazal, a former footballer at Maccabi Netanya, Gazal followed in his father's footsteps when he joined at just nine years of age.

Gazal played for Maccabi Netanya's first squad for the first time in the 1999–2000 season (vs. Hapoel Petah Tikva) and played for Maccabi Netanya until the end of the 2003–04 season, when Maccabi Netanya was relegated and he transferred to Maccabi Haifa. During the season of 2005–06, he was moved on loan to Hapoel Petah-Tiqva and returned to Maccabi Haifa at the end of that season. In October 2007, he transferred to Maccabi Tel Aviv. At the end of the season of 2007–08 he returned to Maccabi Netanya.

On 6 November 2014 signed to Ironi Tiberias. On 13 October 2015 signed to Maccabi Ahi Nazareth.

Gazal has represented Israel at under 21 16 times and full national team 9 times.

Honours
 Israeli Premier League
 Winner (2): 2004–05, 2011–12
 Toto Cup
 Winner (1): 2011–12
 Liga Leumit
 Winner (1): 2016-17

External links

1982 births
Living people
Israeli footballers
Maccabi Haifa F.C. players
Hapoel Petah Tikva F.C. players
Maccabi Netanya F.C. players
Maccabi Tel Aviv F.C. players
Hapoel Ironi Kiryat Shmona F.C. players
Hapoel Be'er Sheva F.C. players
Bnei Sakhnin F.C. players
Ironi Tiberias F.C. players
Maccabi Ahi Nazareth F.C. players
F.C. Tira players
Israel international footballers
Footballers from Netanya
Israeli Premier League players
Israeli people of Egyptian-Jewish descent
Liga Leumit players
Association football midfielders